Rocker covers are covers that are bolted on over rocker arms in an internal combustion engine.  They are called valve covers in the United States, Canada, and in situations where Rocker Arms are not present, such as some Overhead Cam, and most Dual Overhead Cam engines. and rocker boxes in the United Kingdom.

On modern engines without rocker arms they are internationally known as "valve cover" but are sometimes referred to as a "cam cover" or "timing cover" if they also cover the timing gear(s) and belt or chain.

V engines (V6, V8, etc.) usually have two rocker covers, one for each bank of cylinders, while straight engines (I4, I6, etc.) and single-cylinder engines usually have one rocker cover. Very large multi-cylinder engines, such as those used in a ship or in aviation, may have one rocker cover for each cylinder, to make removal and installation more manageable.

History
In early engines, these covers did not exist.  As the rocker arms are critical to having the intake and exhaust valves operate, it was necessary to keep them constantly oiled.  With these early engines, the rocker arms would have to be frequently oiled as the oil was constantly being thrown off or contaminated with dirt from the outside environment.  The rocker cover was invented to keep the oil in and the dirt out.  This part is now found on nearly every existing internal combustion engine today.

Rocker cover gasket

A gasket (rocker cover gasket, or valve cover gasket in the US and Canada) helps seal the joint between the rocker cover and the rest of the engine. Failure of this gasket can cause oil to leak from the engine.

References

Engine components
Engine technology